Ruby Lovett (born February 16, 1967 in Laurel, Mississippi) is an American country music singer-songwriter. Lovett was put up for adoption as a baby. She cut a 45 rpm recording of "One Day at a Time" and "Me and Jesus" when she was 6 years old. She later entered local talent contests and won the True Value Country Showdown three years in a row. She started writing songs at age 10 and formed a band at age 13.

Lovett's mother encouraged her to perform but also to get an education. She studied to become a Radiographer and was working at a hospital in Nashville when she was offered a recording contract. Lovett signed with Curb Records who released her debut album, Ruby Lovett, in January 1998. Its only single, "Look What Love Can Do", peaked at number 73 on the Billboard Hot Country Singles & Tracks chart.

Ruby Lovett (1998)

Critical reception
Thom Owens of Allmusic gave Ruby Lovett three stars out of five, writing that it is "a fine collection of urbane country music that emphasizes her nuanced vocals and skill at interpretation." Randy Lewis of the Los Angeles Times gave the album three stars out of four, saying that it "benefits further from songs, both her own and by other writers, that prize honest emotion over cliche." The album received a favorable review from People, which wrote that Lovett is "an emotional country singer" with "an eclectic mix of songs." Chet Flippo of Billboard also gave the album a positive review, saying that Lovett is the "possessor of a big, expressive voice and a confident delivery" and the album's production is "beautiful, unobtrusive – and very country." Eric Zehnbauer of Country Standard Time praised Lovett's "rich and evocative" voice and wrote that "she infuses her songs with plenty of emotion."

Track listing

Singles

Music videos

References

External links

1967 births
American adoptees
American country singer-songwriters
American women country singers
Curb Records artists
Living people
Country musicians from Mississippi
People from Laurel, Mississippi
Singer-songwriters from Mississippi
21st-century American women